Melanemerella is a genus of mayfly belonging to Ephemerelloidea. It is endemic to Brazil, and is the only member of the family Melanemerellidae.

References 

Mayflies
Insects described in 1920